Muna Al Hashemi (born 1971) is a Bahraini businesswoman and deputy CEO of the Batelco Group.

She previously served as the CEO of Batelco from 2015 to 2017, before assuming her current position. She was ranked 15th by Forbes Middle East amongst the '100 Most Influential Women in the Middle East'. She was also named by Arabian Business as one of the '30 Most Influential Women in the Arab World' in 2019.

Biography
Muna Al Hashemi was born in Bahrain in 1971. She earned a bachelor's degree in electrical engineering from the University of Bahrain alongside a master's degree in electronics and communication in 1994. She later joined Batelco as a trainee engineering graduate in the same year. Her tenure as CEO of Batelco from 2015 to 2017 coincided with the liberalisation of Bahrain's telecom industry against Batelco's monopoly, and saw the company still retaining a leading market share. Under her leadership, Batelco became the first telecom company to launch 4G internet in Bahrain. In 2017, she was appointed as deputy CEO of the Batelco Group, an international telecommunications group with operations in 14 countries including Batelco itself.

In 2018, she was ranked 15th by Forbes Middle East amongst the 100 Most Influential Women in the Middle East, having previously been featured on the list for 4 consecutive years.

Al Hashemi is a board member of the Jordanian telecom company Umniah, as well as the Bahraini tech start-up company C5 Nebula. She also serves as a board member on the Supreme Council for Women in the Kingdom of Bahrain.

References

Bahraini businesspeople
University of Bahrain alumni
1971 births
Living people
Women chief executives